Zdenka Procházková (4 April 1926 – 25 August 2021) was a Czech actress. She was married to Karel Höger, who she starred with in the 1949 film A Dead Man Among the Living, but they were already divorced by the time of his death in 1977.

Selected filmography
Lost in the Suburbs (1948)
A Dead Man Among the Living (1949)
Distant Journey (1949)
Steam Above a Pot (1950)
May Events (1951)
The Fifth Horseman Is Fear (1965)
Hospital at the End of the City (television, 1977)
Upír z Feratu (1982)
Návštěvníci (television, 1983)
Ulice (television, 2005)
The Devil's Mistress (2016)

References

External links

1926 births
2021 deaths
Actresses from Prague
Czech television actresses
Czech film actresses
Czech stage actresses
20th-century Czech actresses
21st-century Czech actresses